Rhys Ruddock (born 13 November 1990) is a professional rugby union player. He currently plays for St Mary's College RFC and Leinster. He plays in the backrow, at 6 or 8. In the 2009/2010 season, he captained the Irish U20s to winning the Six Nations Championship.

Rhys is the son of Welshman and former Wales and Leinster coach Mike Ruddock and Bernadette Mary Ruddock who is  Irish. Born in Dublin and raised in Wales, he opted to follow his brother Ciaran Ruddock in joining the Leinster Academy from Ospreys youth, where he subsequently joined the Irish team soon after. He made his Leinster debut against his father's old club Newport Gwent Dragons.

In summer 2010, whilst playing for his first club in Ireland UCD, Ruddock got a call up to the Irish senior squad for their 2010 summer tour where he received his first cap vs Australia due to the shortage of back-row players to injury. He started against New Zealand Māori in a non-cap match, and won his first cap for Ireland when he came off the bench against .

Ruddock was part of the Ireland squad for the 2012 Six Nations tournament.  Meanwhile, with Leinster, he became their youngest ever captain against Arioni in the Magners League, when he was still playing for UCD's under-20 side.

Ruddock captained Ireland against the United States in the 2018 Autumn International, a match Ireland won 57–14.

Honours
Leinster
European Rugby Champions Cup (3): 2011, 2012, 2018
Pro14 (6): 2013, 2014, 2018, 2019, 2020, 2021
European Challenge Cup (1): 2013

Ireland
Six Nations Championship (1): 2014

Individual 
Pro14 Team of the Year (1): 2014

See also

Mike Ruddock

References

External links
Leinster Profile
Ireland Profile
Pro14 Profile

Irish people of Welsh descent
Irish rugby union players
Ireland international rugby union players
Rugby union players from Dublin (city)
University College Dublin R.F.C. players
St Mary's College RFC players
Irish Exiles rugby union players
Living people
1990 births
People educated at Millfield
Rugby union flankers
Leinster Rugby players
Swansea RFC players